Sun Run is a  long 1st order tributary to the Ararat River in Patrick County, Virginia.  This is the only stream in the United States with this name.

Course
Sun Run rises on the Big Laurel Creek divide in Patrick County about 0.25 miles east of Groundhog Mountain.  Sun Run then flows east then curves south to join the Ararat River about 2 miles northwest of Carters Mill, Virginia.

Watershed
Sun Run drains  of area, receives about 54.3 in/year of precipitation, has a wetness index of 283.34, and is about 80% forested.

See also
List of rivers of Virginia

References

Rivers of Virginia
Rivers of Patrick County, Virginia